Frank John Burls (1902-1976), was a male English international table tennis player.

He won two bronze medals at the 1926 World Table Tennis Championships and the 1929 World Table Tennis Championships in the men's team event.

He was a civil servant by trade and won the 1926 Civil Service Championship and finished runner-up in the 1926 Kent Championship.

See also
 List of England players at the World Team Table Tennis Championships
 List of World Table Tennis Championships medalists

References

English male table tennis players
1902 births
1976 deaths
World Table Tennis Championships medalists